Government failure, in the context of public economics, is an economic inefficiency caused by a government intervention, if the inefficiency would not exist in a true free market. The costs of the government intervention are greater than the benefits provided. It can be viewed in contrast to a market failure, which is an economic inefficiency that results from the free market itself, and can potentially be corrected through government regulation. However, Government failure often arises from an attempt to solve market failure. The idea of government failure is associated with the policy argument that, even if particular markets may not meet the standard conditions of perfect competition required to ensure social optimality, government intervention may make matters worse rather than better.

As with a market failure, government failure is not a failure to bring a particular or favored solution into existence but is rather a problem that prevents an efficient outcome. The problem to be solved does not need to be market failure; governments may act to create inefficiencies even when an efficient market solution is possible.

Government failure (by definition) does not occur when government action creates winners and losers, making some people better off and others worse off than they would be without governmental regulation. It occurs only when governmental action creates an inefficient outcome, where efficiency would otherwise exist. A defining feature of government failure is where it would be possible for everyone to be better off (Pareto improvement) under a different regulatory environment.

Examples of government failure include regulatory capture and regulatory arbitrage. Government failure may arise because of unanticipated consequences of a government intervention, or because an inefficient outcome is more politically feasible than a Pareto improvement to it. Government failure can be on both the demand side and the supply side. Demand-side failures include preference-revelation problems and the illogic of voting and collective behaviour. Supply-side failures largely result from principal–agent problem. Government failure may arise in any of three ways the government can involve in an area of social and economic activity: provision, taxation or subsidy and regulation.

History 
The phrase "government failure" emerged as a term of art in the early 1960s with the rise of intellectual and political criticism of government regulations. Building on the premise that the only legitimate rationale for government regulation was market failure, economists advanced new theories arguing that government interventions in markets were costly and tend to fail.

An early use of "government failure" was by Ronald Coase (1964) in comparing an actual and ideal system of industrial regulation:
Contemplation of an optimal system may provide techniques of analysis that would otherwise have been missed and, in certain special cases, it may go far to providing a solution. But in general its influence has been pernicious. It has directed economists’ attention away from the main question, which is how alternative arrangements will actually work in practice. It has led economists to derive conclusions for economic policy from a study of an abstract of a market situation. It is no accident that in the literature...we find a category "market failure" but no category "government failure." Until we realize that we are choosing between social arrangements which are all more or less failures, we are not likely to make much headway.

Roland McKean used the term in 1965 to suggest limitations on an invisible-hand notion of government behavior. More formal and general analysis followed Later, due to the popularity of public choice theory in 1970s, government failure attracted the attention of the academic community.

Causes of government failure

Imperfect information 
Imperfect information may be a source of not only the market failure, but also of the government one. While a perfectly informed government might make an effort to reach the social equilibrium via quality, quantity, price or market structure regulation, it is difficult for the government to obtain necessary information (such as production costs) to make right decisions. This absence may then result in flawed quantity regulation when either too much or too little of the good or service is produced, subsequently creating either excess supply or excess demand.

Human factor 
People working inside the governments are also ordinary humans. It is usual for humans to strive to reach personal interests and maximize welfare. Thus if a person places own interests above common interests, decisions taken by such person can degrade public welfare.

Influence of interest or pressure groups 
Not uncommon is also the impact of people or even groups of people, who are able to manipulate politicians inside a government in order to reach their common goals. These groups usually have a powerful influence. It is difficult for the society to confront them because these groups act in a coherent way due to restricted number of members and shared objective in contrast to the rest of the society.

Political self-interest 
When politicians and civil servants seek to pursuit self-interest, it can lead to incorrect allocation of resources. The pressures of the upcoming elections or the influence of interest groups can support an environment in which inappropriate spending and tax decisions can be made, e.g., increasing social expenditure before the elections or presenting the main capital expenditure items for infrastructure projects without the projects being subjected to a full and proper cost-benefit analysis to determine the likely social costs and benefits.

Policy myopia 
Another cause of the government failure, as many critics of government intervention claim, is that politicians tend to look for short term fixes with instant and visible results that do not have to last, to difficult economic problems rather than making thorough analysis for solving long term solutions.

Government intervention and evasion 
It is believed that when a government tries to levy higher taxes on goods such as alcohol, also called de-merit goods, it can lead to increase attempts of illegal activities as tax avoidance, tax evasion or development of grey markets, people could try to sell goods with no taxes. Also legalizing and taxing some drugs may arise in a quick expansion of the supply of drugs, which can lead to overconsumption, which can mean a decrease in welfare.

Government subsidies may lead to excess demand, which can be solved in two ways. Either the government chooses to meet all the demand, leading to higher consumption than socially efficient or if it knows the socially efficient amount, it can decide who gets how much of this quantity, a goal accomplished either through queuing and waiting-lists or through delegating the decisions to bureaucrats. Both solutions are inefficient, queueing first meets the demand of people at the front of the queue, which might not be the ones who need or want the product or service the most, but rather the luckiest or the ones with the right connections. Delegating the decisions to bureaucrats leads to problems with human factor and personal interests.

High administrative and enforcement costs 
When the government intervenes and tries to correct market failure, the substantial amount of money may turn out to exceed the initial funds.

Regulatory Capture 
Regulatory capture is a problem which occurs whilst trying to implement regulations in selected industry. As government regulators usually have to meet with the industry representatives, they tend to form a personal relationship, which may lead them to be more sympathetic towards requirements and needs of given industry, subsequently making the regulations more favourable towards the producers rather than the society.

Examples

Economic crowding out 
Crowding out is the displacement of private sector investment by way of higher interest rates, when the government expands its borrowing to finance increased expenditure or tax cuts in excess of revenue. Government spending is also said to crowd out private spending by individuals.

Regulatory 
Regulatory arbitrage is a regulated institution's taking advantage of the difference between its real (or economic) risk and the regulatory position.

Regulatory capture is the co-opting of regulatory agencies by members of or the entire regulated industry. Rent seeking and rational ignorance are two of the mechanisms which allow this to happen.

Regulatory risk is the risk faced by private-sector firms that regulatory changes will hurt their business.

Alexander Hamilton of the World Bank Institute argued in 2013 that rent extraction positively correlates with government size even in stable democracies with high income, robust rule of law mechanisms, transparency, and media freedom.

Many Austrian economists, such as Murray Rothbard, argue that regulation is the source of market failure in the form of monopoly, adding that the term "natural monopoly" is a misnomer. From this perspective, all governmental interference in free markets creates inefficiencies and are therefore less preferable to private market self-correction.

Distortion of markets 
Taxation can lead to market distortion. They can artificially change prices thus distorting markets and disturb the way markets allocate scarce resources. Also, taxes can give people incentive to evade them, which is illegal. Minimum price can also result in markets’ distortion (i.e. alcohol, tobacco). Consumer would spend more on harmful goods, therefore less of their income will be spent on beneficial goods. Subsidies can also lead to misuse of scarce resources as they can help inefficient enterprises by protecting them from free market forces.

Price floors and price ceilings can also lead to social inefficiencies or other negative consequences. If price floors, such as minimum wage, are set above the market equilibrium price, they lead to shortage in supply, in case of minimum wage to a higher unemployment. Similarly the price ceilings, if set under the market equilibrium price, lead to shortage in supply. Rent ceiling for example may then lead to shortage in accommodation. Other problems often arise as consequences of these interventions. Black market of labor and higher unemployment among uneducated and poor are possible consequences of minimum wage while deterioration of residential buildings might be caused by rent ceiling and subsequent lack of incentive for landlords to provide the best services possible.

Administration costs 
Enforcement of laws through legal system and tax collection demand considerable costs. Excessive bureaucracy can lead to inefficiency and public sector might face principal-agent problem.

Unintended consequences 
Government intervention may result in unpredictable outcomes. Average speed on a particular road with traffic calming measures might increase (people would drive faster) as drivers may speed up between warning signs and speed bumps.

State monopolies 
Most government providers operate as monopolies (e.g. post offices). Their status is sometimes guaranteed by the government, protecting them from potential competition. Furthermore, as opposed to private monopolies, the thread of bankruptcy is eliminated, as these companies are backed by government money. The companies are thus not facing many efficiency pressures which would push them towards cost minimisation - causing a social inefficiency.

There are still some existing efficiency pressures on state monopoly managers. They mostly come from the possibility of their political masters being voted out of office. These pressures are however unlikely to be as effective as market pressures, the reasons being that the elections are held quite infrequently and even their results are often fairly independent on the efficiency of state monopolies.

Corruption 
The private utilization of public resources by the government officials. Corruption can take many forms, ranging from direct misappropriation of government funds to the collection of bribes in exchange for public policies.

EU Fisheries Policy 
A leading example of governmental failure can be seen with the consequences of the European Union's Common Fisheries Policy  (CFP). Set up to counteract a concern of balancing natural marine resources with commercial profiteering, the CFP has in turn created political upheaval.

Overcoming government failure 
When a country gets into this kind of complicated situation it is not possible to reverse it right away. However, there are some arrangements that the government could do, to try to overcome it step by step. For example:
 The government could assign itself some future goals, and also try to fulfil them
 Competitive Tendering – making good offers to private and public sector which may arise on into competition between them, which is good for moving forward
 Public & Private Partnerships – involving private professional to make decisions to cut less necessary costs or to help to make some decisions. One of the key steps can also be to delegate the power and decisions, which may release the pressure from the government and help it to concentrate on more important cases

See also 

 Abilene paradox
 Dispersed knowledge
 Dunning–Kruger effect
 Economic interventionism
 Government waste
 Law of unintended consequences
 Market failure
 Perverse subsidies
 Statism
 Tragedy of the commons
 X-inefficiency
 Overdiagnosis

Notes

References 
 Aidt, Toke S. (2003). "Economic Analysis of Corruption: A Survey," Economic Journal, 113(491), Features, pp. F632–F652.
 Becker, Gary (1958) "Competition and Democracy,"  Journal of Law and Economics, 1, pp. 105–1109. 
 _ (1983). "A Theory of Competition among Pressure Groups for Political Influence," Quarterly Journal of Economics, 98(3), pp. 371–400.
 Dollery, Brian, and Andrew Worthington (1996). "The Evaluation of Public Policy: Normative Economic Theories of Government Failure," Journal of Interdisciplinary Economics, 7(1), pp. 27–39.
 Grier,  Robin M. and, Kevin B. Grier "Political cycles in nontraditional settings: theory and evidence from the case of Mexico", JLE vol. XLIII (April 2000), p. 239
 Kolko, Gabriel (1977), The Triumph of Conservatism, The Free Press, 
 Kolko, Gabriel (1977), Railroads and Regulation, 1877–1916, Greenwood Publishing Company, 
 The New Palgrave Dictionary of Economics (2008), 2nd Edition with Table of Contents/Abstract links:    "laissez-faire, economists and" by Roger E. Backhouse and Steven G. Medema    "rational choice and political science" by Susanne Lohmann.
 Niskanen, William (1967), The Peculiar Economics of Bureaucracy, Institute for Defense Analyses, Program Analysis Division (1967), 
 _ (1971), Bureaucracy and Representative Government, Aldine, Atherton, 

Economic problems
Market failure
Public choice theory
Libertarian theory
Public economics